Pastora Vega Aparicio (born 28 May 1960) is a Spanish actress and television host. She appeared in more than thirty films since 1985.

She appeared in the TV series Entreolivos, by Antonio Cuadri and starring Ana Ruiz, Eduardo Velasco, María Ramos, Ángel Caballero and Jesús Carrillo.

Television

Movies

Theater

Television Programs

Awards

References

External links 

1960 births
Living people
Spanish film actresses